Football Club Prishtina, commonly known as Prishtina, is a professional football club based in Prishtina, Kosovo. The club play in the Football Superleague of Kosovo, and is the most successful club in Kosovo. The club is also the only club in Kosovo to have never have been relegated from the league.

History
The club was founded in 1922 under the name Kosova. Later on their name changed to Proleter, Jedinstvo, Kosova and finally Prishtina.

1922–1926:  Beginnings of FC Prishtina (Futboll Klub Kosova)
Football in Kosovo has been played and developed since 1919, shortly after the end of the First World War. Many demobilized soldiers and officers, as well as students studying at universities in France, Switzerland, Italy, Austria, England, Bucharest, Budapest, and elsewhere, began to return to their home countries. Thus, a student of Samerslen College Grenoble (France) brought the first soccer ball to Prishtina in 1919. This gift he had from a doctor where he came from.

After the arrival of the first ball in Prishtina and Kosovo, mainly young people started running after it, but there was no organized way of playing.

Only friendly matches took place at that time. The city of Prishtina was just a town with 16,000 inhabitants when in 1922 the first blue club was formed, called "Kosova". This was a club that at that time consisted of soldiers of the Prishtina Garrison and did not hold official matches because it was not registered, but in its formation constantly played quality footballers of the Prishtina Garrison army.

Kosovo's oldest club did not compete at official levels, but played friendly matches with other teams, meanwhile formed by the country and Macedonia. In 1926 in Prishtina was formed the football club "Bashkimi", which gathered mainly craft youth. This club was materially much more consolidated than "Kosova". This team took advantage of the opportunity and registered with the Banovina Skopje Football Sub-League. There is no data on the level of competition.

1939–1945: War years

In the beginning the club competed in Yugoslav lower leagues all the way until the beginning of World War II when the region was annexed to Albania. In 1942 Prishtina competed in the North group of the 1942 Albanian Championship finishing in fourth and bottom place of their group.

1945–1981: First success in Yugoslavian Football
After the end of the war the club returned to the Yugoslav league system and played for mostly in the Yugoslav Second League. FC Prishtina won in 1945 and 1946 they won the Kosovo Province Titel and are the first Kosovar to do so but the success did not end there. In the Season 1947 FC Prishtina wrote History for being one of the Founder Clubs in the new SFR Yugoslavia Cup in this Season. In their first ever Cup match they played against Goce Delcev from Prilep. FC Prishtina won this match with 1–0 and qualify for the next Round. In the second Round FC Prishtina had an harder tie against Rabotnicki Skopje from the second League, but FC Prishtina did not give up and won this Match away in Skopje with 1–2 and became the first Albanian Club to ever reach the Round of 16 in a Regional competition in their first ever Cup Season. In the Round of 16 FC Prishtina had to play away against Partizan Belgrad despite a good performance they lost this match 2–0.
 
Fc Prishtina also were close to qualify for their first time in the Yugoslav First League in the season 1972–73 but they lost the playoffs games against NK Osijek from Croatia and could not Progress in the Main division. After losing in the home in Prishtina the leg with 1–2 and away with 0–1 in Osijek.

1981–1989: The Golden Generation

FC Prishtina was now stabilized and a scary team had been created and only its explosion was expected. The 1980–81 season was difficult both for Pristina and for the entire population of Kosovo due to the political situation that had been created. From March (1981), Dimovski will be replaced by another coach, the Hungarian from Vojvodina, Béla Pálfi (March 1981 – July 1983), who has great merit for qualifying the team in the elite and creating a great team. The team this season was forced to spend almost the entire spring season outside the city (in Kragujevac, Serbia) due to the ban on sports activity in Kosovo and had managed without any problems to rank in the middle of the table. Prishtina with Pálfi, in the 1981/82 season finishes in 8th place. In the 1982/83 season, the white and blue team had finally started to make history and after 60 years of its creation, and after 20 years of struggling in the Second League, a generation, called Golden, was finally created that violated all in front of him, who had extraordinary leaders and an army of fans with an average of 30,000 per match.

There was no stopping the team from the Kosovar capital and not only that, this team had become so big that now a 22 Million Yugoslavia was afraid of him and aroused respect for him. FC Prishtina after entering the first Federal League has competed for five consecutive seasons in it. In her first year in the elite, she also played in the Central European Cup where she took second place among the four teams. In the same year, two players from Prishtina, in the same match, make their debut for the then Yugoslav national team, the strikers: Fadil Vokrri and Zoran Batrovic. For Batrovic, this was the only appearance left, while Vokrri had continued to defend the colors of the state that no longer exists. This did honor to Pristina and elevated it among the biggest teams in the country. Meanwhile, in five years of competitions in the First League, Prishtina was led by well-known Yugoslav football names. Fuad Muzurovic had been the first Pristina coach to lead the team to the highest level of the country, which had the league among the four or five strongest in Europe. Muzurovic, later the coach of Bosnia and Herzegovina, had led the team from July 1983 until the same time in 1984. Then he returned in July 1985 and led the capital from Prishtina to in August 1986.

After Muzurovic, the bench was taken over by the other great strategist of the former Yugoslavia, Vukashin Vishnjevac, who, however, had not been so dear to some key players of the team, as he had withstood the pressure and his adventure in Prishtina had ended. in November 1984.
Then, quite successfully for three months, the team was led by the Albanian coach, Ajet Shosholli. Shosholli until that time had been only the second Albanian coach, after Mensur Bajrami (January–April '77), who had led the team. Meanwhile, the position in the table had been aggravated and the leaders of the club had been forced to find a famous coach and the solution was with Miroslav Blazevic. The lease that later with the Croatian Representative reaches the third place in "France '98", contributes to the merits of the club remaining in the First League. The lease had only lasted for two months, long enough for him to remain one of the most memorable of that time. Prishtina continues for another three seasons in the collection of the best and in its ranks gravitate two other well-known strategists of the time, Milovan orioriq (October 1986 – September 1987) and Josip Duvançi (September 1987 – June 1988) with whom eventually Prishtina falls out of the league. The team had left some of its stars, some had now retired, while the tense political situation and the decline of interest of Kosovo's political and social structures had made Pristina no longer able to stay in the first federal League. With the relegation from the League, Prishtina brings together the next generation of talented people from Kosovo who are first led by another well-known name in former Yugoslav football, Miladin ivivadinovi (July 1988 – March 1989). In the first season since the fall (1988/89) Prishtina played with minus 6 points and again fought and achieved culminating results, but did not manage to climb back into the elite.

Notes
1 Prishtina were docked six points due to match fixing in the last round of the previous season.2 Two points for winners. If the game finished as a draw, penalty kicks were taken and only the winner gained one point. In brackets are those penalty-kick points.3 Championship abandoned officially on 14 May 1999 due to the NATO bombing of Yugoslavia. Due to UNMIK, FC Prishtina were able to play in the Kosovan league system only.

After 1991
After Kosovo proclaimed independence from Serbia, FC Prishtina left the Yugoslav football league system and became part of the Independent League of Kosovo, which became the highest football division of Kosovo and would be renamed to the Football Superleague of Kosovo after the Kosovo War in 1999. As the Kosovar club with most successful results in the past and the best infrastructure, FC Prishtina won the first edition of the competition in the 1991–92 season. Afterwards, it won the competition again in the 1995–96 and 1996–97 seasons.

Since 1991, FC Prishtina has been Kosovo champion 11 times, making it the most successful Kosovar club since Kosovo left the Yugoslav football league system. Between 1945 and 1991 the Kosovar league was a regional league of the Yugoslav league system, and FC Prishtina did not gather many titles in that league because it usually competed in higher national levels.

Supporters
Prishtina is an Albanian supported club with fans around Albanian communities in the Balkans and in Diaspora. The fans sing the Albanian National Anthem before every game and only affiliate with the Albanian nation and identity. 

Plisat are the ultras group of Prishtina. They stand in the South part of the stadium. In the late eighties, there were quite a few small groups with different group names. It was in those years that most of the fans of Prishtina chose to identify as "Plisat". "Plisat" have never been separated from the club even during Yugoslavia's anti-Albanian policies. In addition to football, they started to follow and support the basketball club with the same fervour. As the organisation grew, it began to resemble some of the other large fan groups in the region and the rest of Europe. They also support the Albania National Team.

Honours

Players

Current squad

Notable former players
This is a list of FC Prishtina players with senior national team appearances:

Kosovo and Albania
Youth
 Agim Zeka
 Ardin Dallku
 Bledar Hajdini
 Edon Zhegrova
 Eros Grezda

Senior
 Ahmed Januzi
 Anel Rashkaj
 Ardian Ismajli
 Armend Dallku
 Armend Thaqi
 Besnik Hasi
 Debatik Curri
 Enis Gavazaj
 Kushtrim Mushica
 Liridon Latifi
 Mehmet Dragusha
 Mentor Zhdrella
 Visar Bekaj
 Ylber Ramadani
 Yll Hoxha

Other countries
 Ardian Kozniku
 Kujtim Shala
 Draško Božović
 Goran Đorović
 Fadil Vokrri
 Ismet Hadžić
 Vladan Radača
 Vladislav Đukić
 Zoran Batrović

Personnel

List of the managers
This is the list of coaches of FC Prishtina:

 Petar Purić (1950s)
 Slavko Stanić (1961)
 Ilija Dimovski (1979–81)
 Béla Pálfi (1981–83)
 Fuad Muzurović (1983–84)
 Vukašin Višnjevac (1984)
 Ajet Shosholli (1984–85)
 Fuad Muzurović (1985–86)
 Miroslav Blažević (1986)
 Milovan Đorić (1986–87)
 Josip Duvančić (1987–88)
 Milan Živadinović (1988–89)
 Hysni Maxhunaj (1989–90)
 Ajet Shosholli (1990–91)
 Burim Hatipi (1994–95)
 Jusuf Tortoshi (1995–98)
 Ajet Shosholli (1999–00)
 Jusuf Tortoshi (2000–01)
 Medin Zhega (2001–02)
 Arbnor Morina (2002)
 Ramiz Krasniqi (2002)
 Ajet Shosholli (2002–05)
 Fadil Muriqi (2005–06)
 Ramiz Krasniqi (2006)
 Kujtim Shala (2006–07)
 Ramadan Cimili (2007)
 Afrim Tovërlani (2007–09)
 Besnik Kollari (2009)
 Skënder Shengyli (2009)
 Ramiz Krasniqi (2010 – Nov 2011)
 Wolfgang Jerat (2011)
 Jusuf Tortoshi (2011)
 Ejup Mehmeti ( – 18 Oct 2012)
 Afrim Tovërlani (2012–14)
 Suad Keçi (2 Apr 2014 – Jun 2014)
 Bylbyl Sokoli (7 Jul 2014 – 20 Apr 15)
 Ramiz Krasniqi (20 Apr 2015 – 19 Oct 2015)
 Sami Sermaxhaj (21 Oct 2015 – Mar 2016)
 Fadil Berisha (22 Mar 2016 – 27 Jun 2016)
 Kushtrim Munishi (2 Jul 2016 – Sep 2016)
 Lutz Lindemann (21 Sep 2016 – 29 Mar 2017)
 Arsim Thaqi (29 Mar 2017 – Sep 2017)
 Mirel Josa (19 Sep 2017 – 2 Sep 2019)
 Bylbyl Sokoli (4 Sep 2019 – 21 Sep 2019)
 Armend Dallku (21 Sep 2019–04 Sep 2020)
 Zekirija Ramadani (04 Sep 2020–14 Nov 2021)
 Abdulah Ibraković (14 Nov 2021–14 May 2022) 
 Ismet Munishi (3 June 2022 – 13 Mar 2023)

List of the presidents

 Borislav Božović (1971)
 Gani Pula (1971–73)
 Ramadan Vraniqi (1973–76)
 Gani Pula (1976–77)
 Blagoje Kostić (1977–81)
 Nazmi Mustafa (1981–82)
 Sadik Vllasaliu (1982–83)
 Mehmet Maliqi (1983–84)
 Muharrem Ismajli (1984–86)
 Bajram Tmava (1986–88)
 Živorad Ivić (1988–89)
 Shefqet Keqekolla (1989)
 Mile Savić (1989–90)
 Beqir Aliu (1991–99)
 Remzi Ejupi (2004–present)

Kit suppliers

Statistics in Superleague of Kosovo

The all-time list of football clubs that have participated in the Football Superleague of Kosovo, prior to the 2019–2020 season. The ranking is based on the total accumulated points by Prishtina.

Prishtina in Europe
KF Prishtina competed for the Mitropa Cup finals in the 1983–84 season. Being also the one and only Albanian Football Club to do so. Being Runner Up in this competition by a single point to Eisenstadt from Austria. Also being the first Kosovan Football side to compete in a UEFA Football competition.

Prishtina competed in the UEFA Europa League for the first time in the 2017–18 season, entering at the first qualifying round. On 19 June 2017, in Nyon, the draw was held and Prishtina were drawn against Swedish side Norrköping. On 5 July 2018, Prishtina beat the Gibraltarian side Europa at Adem Jashari Olympic Stadium in Mitrovica and became the first Kosovan side to win a UEFA Europa League match.

Matches

UEFA club coefficient ranking

Notes and references

Explanatory notes

References

External links
  

 
1922 establishments in Yugoslavia
Association football clubs established in 1922
Prishtina
Prishtina
Sport in Pristina